= Free Choice 2008 Committee =

The Free Choice 2008 Committee is an entity chaired by chess champion Garry Kasparov and dedicated to an unconditional adherence to fundamental democratic values.

To this end, they have issued a declaration protesting what they see as a drift toward autocracy by the presidential regime of Vladimir Putin.

...the presidential regime has reduced both chambers of the Russian parliament to the condition of puppets, and has turned the prosecutor’s office and court into an instrument of blackmail and political repressions. For the sake of power the Kremlin has trampled the principle of inviolability of private property, imposed illegal taxes on business, and divided entrepreneurs into "bad" and "good" depending on their submission and readiness to support the president’s political projects.

--From the Declaration
